A gunsmith is a person who repairs, modifies, designs, or builds guns. The occupation differs from an armorer, who usually replaces only worn parts in standard firearms. Gunsmiths do modifications and changes to a firearm that may require a very high level of craftsmanship, requiring the skills of a top-level machinist, a very skilled woodworker, and even an engineer. Gunsmiths perform factory-level repairs and renovations to restore a well-used or deteriorated firearms to new condition. They may make alterations to adapt sporting guns to better fit the individual shooter that may require extensive modifications to the firearm's stocks and metal parts. Repairs and redesigns may require fabrication and fitting of unavailable parts and assemblies constructed by smiths themselves. Gunsmiths may also renew metal finishes or apply decorative carvings or engravings to guns. Many gun shops offer gunsmithing service on the premises.

Overview

Gunsmiths may be employed in:
factories by firearms manufacturers in their in-house Custom Shop,
armories by military or law-enforcement agencies,
sporting goods stores, or
small gunsmith shops, as either the owner, or as one of a handful of employees.

To pursue the entirety of this trade, a gunsmith must possess skills as a parts fabricator, a metalworker or blacksmith, a woodworker and an artisan; be knowledgeable in shop mathematics, ballistics, chemistry, and materials engineering; be knowledgeable in the use and application of a variety of hand, power, and machinists tools and measuring devices; and be capable of working accurately and precisely. Those who are (self-) employed in small gunsmith shops must also possess skills as small business operators; work effectively with a wide variety of customers; and remain abreast of, and comply with federal, state, and local laws, ordinances, and requirements.

Due to the great breadth of subject matter to be mastered, many gunsmiths specialize in only a few of the skills required of the general gunsmith. Alternatively, some gunsmiths learn many of the skills of the trade but only apply them to a few weapon types (e.g., only pistols, only shotguns, only specific brands or models).

Responsibilities

The primary responsibility of a gunsmith is to ensure that guns work and function safely. Gunsmiths accomplish this by always properly observing and demonstrating  gun safety in their handling procedures: both in their own actions and in the actions of their customers and the people around them. They accomplish that task secondly by inspecting guns to ensure safe mechanical operation. Gunsmiths use their in-depth knowledge of guns to guide inspections: either repairing deficiencies or notifying customers of unsafe conditions and taking steps to prevent catastrophic failures.

Some of the conditions a gunsmith looks for when inspecting a firearm brought to them for repairs are improper assembly, missing parts, cracks, bore obstruction, improper headspace, improper timing, safety malfunctions, worn sear edges, and deformed firing pin tips, among other problems.

Common tasks

(listed in approximate, but not exact, order of increasing difficulty)
 Disassemble, clean, inspect, lubricate and reassemble.
 Remove corrosion and touch-up finish.
 Repair burred or damaged parts with files and stones.
 Replace defective parts with factory-made replacements, hand-fitting as necessary.
 Add after-market customizations:
 sling-swivels
 recoil-pads
 iron-sights
 scopes
 grip caps
 butt plates
 Repair and re-finish wooden stock parts.
 Checker or re-checker grip areas.
 Deepen or clean up worn or damaged engravings and markings.
 Re-crown damaged muzzles on a lathe.
 Repair dented shotgun barrels.
 Install (solder) or repair rib on shotgun barrels, or repair double-barrel assemblies.
 Measure and correct head-space dimensions.
 Check for excessive bore erosion.
 Troubleshoot and repair feeding, ejecting and firing problems.
 Test-fire guns with conventional loads to ensure proper operation.
 Fabricate wooden stocks to customer specifications and body dimensions. Fit same to existing receiver and barrel.
 Glass-bed actions to stocks to improve accuracy.
 Remove existing metal finish, and re-blue metal parts.
 Fabricate replacement parts from metal stock.
 Modify trigger-pull weight through careful stoning of trigger mechanism parts.
 Fire proof-loads through weapons to ensure sufficient strength of parts under over-load conditions.
 Replace worn barrels, which have fired so many rounds that they are no longer of the specified caliber (which leads to loss of accuracy).
 Change caliber or cartridge of existing rifle, by changing barrel, and modifying receiver.
 Re-cut rifling and change caliber of existing barrel.
 Design and build complete rifles by fitting stock barrels to stock receivers; fabricating or purchasing additional parts as needed, and fitting same to rifle. Fitting custom stock to the same.
 Design and build a complete rifle, shotgun, or combination gun from start to finish. (Combination guns, usually referred to as a "Drilling", is a highly complex hand-made long gun with several joined barrels combining both rifle and shotgun calibers and gauges sharing a common breech and buttstock.) The highest level examples of custom-made firearms usually start out as several pieces of blank steel stock or rough forged parts,  a slab (stock blank) of walnut; steel tubes with rifled or smooth holes ("bores") drilled their length,  and are usually hand made by highly skilled gunsmiths using nothing more than an occasional lathe, milling machine, heat treating furnace (for making springs, hardening parts to the proper hardness, and color case hardening) with the majority of roughing, fitting, and finishing done completely by hand using files, scrapers, abrasive paper and cloth, chisels and rasps.

Specializations

While some gunsmiths are general practitioners in this trade, some of the more important specializations are:

Custom builder/designer
Builds guns to customer's specification, from raw materials and shelf parts. Gunsmiths specializing in custom areas can be called upon by professional target-shooters, avid sports shooters, or anyone that wants custom attributes added to their firearm to create highly accurate or custom looking firearms. A Custom Gunsmith also builds high-end firearms for hunters and shooters with needs and desires that cannot be served by standard catalogued firearms offered by gun manufacturers. They may work in partnership with engravers and other specialized artists to produce unique finishes and decorations not possible on regular mass-produced firearms. Some highly specialized gunsmiths can complete all firearm modifications without anyone else in the industry helping them. This is likely the most highly skilled of gunsmiths, as they are required not only to have proficiency in the other areas of gunsmithing, but must also be well educated in firearm finishing and machining, in order to manufacture the individual components and even springs before assembly takes place.

Finisher
Applies various chemical processes (browning, bluing, Parkerization, among others) to the metal parts of guns to develop corrosion resistant surface layers on the steel. They may also apply case hardening to low carbon steel parts. Case hardening is a combined chemical and heat-treatment process which introduces carbon into the surfaces of low steel alloys that does not contain sufficient carbon to allow total ("through") heat treatment. This carbon rich surface is then heat treated resulting in a thin, very hard surface layer with a tough, malleable core. This process can be done solely for the mechanical properties (hardness and toughness) it imparts, or, by packing the parts in bone charcoal and other chemicals and heating in a heat treatment furnace for varying time periods, it is possible to introduce rich colors into the carbonized surface. This type of case hardening, known as color case hardening, is prized for its rich mottled blues, purples, browns and grey tones. It is possible, with highly skilled craftsmen using highly proprietary processes, to control the hues and patterns so closely that one familiar with high grade custom firearms can usually recognize the maker of another shooter's firearm solely by the colors and patterns on its parts; an important distinction on extremely costly firearms of the highest grade. Typically, its use is usually restricted to receivers, rarely barrels. Although providing corrosion resistance, the colored surface layers are subject to wear and may also fade with time. Antique firearms for sale frequently note the specific percentage of the factory original case coloring remaining on the receiver and lockplates. Renewing this color case hardening to the specific patterns of the firearm when it was new has become an important sub-area of the gunsmithing field.

Stockmaker
Carves gun stocks from wood (usually walnut; although birch, maple, and apple wood, among others, are frequently seen). Fits stocks to the metal parts of the gun (receiver and barrel), as well as to customer's body dimensions. With custom made shotguns, the fit to the individual shooter is vital, as the shot cloud's impact is largely determined by the way the stock fits the shooter. Very high grade firearms may have stocks fashioned from very costly blanks, mostly of one of the walnut varieties, specially chosen for its rare and highly figured grain. The fashioning of high end gunstocks calls for an extremely high level of skill and craftsmanship, as the finished product must be pleasing aesthetically, fit the shooting customer like an orthopedic device, all the while having the ability to withstand high levels of recoil from the firing of many thousands of rounds. Wood gunstocks may be fashioned with automated machinery (for production firearms) while high end gunstocks are hand made using saws, chisels, gouges, rasps, and files. The surfaces are then finished by sanding, scraping, staining, oiling, or lacquering.

Checkerer
(This specialization is frequently combined with that of the Stockmaker) Uses checkering tools to create an ornate pattern of small raised diamonds in the wood surfaces which are to be gripped. The checkering tools are in effect tiny saws, designed to leave a v-shaped groove (of approximately 60 to 90 degrees) in the surface of the wooden gunstock. Special checkering tools consisting of two saw blades in parallel are used to set the spacing, usually between 16 and 24 lines per inch (1.0 mm to 1.6 mm line width). The area to be checkered is covered by one set of such grooves parallel to each other. A second set of parallel grooves is then executed across the first set, at approximately a 30-degree angle, leaving the area covered with small, pointed diamonds. The edges of the checkered area are frequently ornamented with simple bas-relief wood carving, frequently variations on the fleur-de-lis.

Gun engraver
 Uses hand-gravers or die-sinker's chisels to cut designs or pictures into the metal surfaces of the gun, primarily the receiver. The firearms engraver must first be a highly gifted and capable artist that can first compose the desired design freehand on paper. In many cases, the customer must be consulted and must approve the design. In some cases, the engraving may incorporate a favorite scene, a revered hunting dog, or even family members and residences. The engraver must have a thorough knowledge of human and animal anatomy, perspective, botany, and composition. The smallness and geometry of the parts must also be considered, and harmony between all these factors must artistically agree.

These designs must then be cut freehand into the tough hardened steel surfaces of the firearm. Pneumatically driven engraving systems, such as the Gravermeister, developed by GRS Tools, may be used to replace or supplement hand-powered engraving, but the guiding of these powered tools is still provided by the artist. Other metals (especially gold and silver) may be inlaid and engraved to further the design. Designs usually consist of elaborate scroll-work based upon Acanthus leaves or vines, or may be of purely abstract spirals. Before the development of corrosion resistant surface treatments for steel, gun surfaces were engraved to retain more oil to prevent rust. In modern usage, guns are engraved purely for artistic reasons. Top grade engraving is very expensive but well executed, tastefully designed engraving always adds significantly to the value of quality firearms. Many of the world's foremost art museums have highly decorated firearms in their collections because of the high artistic merit and craftsmanship of their engraved, chiseled, and carved decoration. Many books exist on the subject of highly decorated firearms, with detailed illustrations showing their "art in steel".

Pistolsmith
Specializes in work on pistols and revolvers. Pistolsmiths should be proficient in a range of skills such as woodworking, checkering, machining, metal finishing and metalworking. They must have an excellent understanding of the mechanical characteristics and function of the guns they work on. Often a pistolsmith is called on for extensive customization of a handgun making it better suited for its intended purpose. A good example of this is changing the factory sights for new front and rear sights more suited to the purposes of the user.  A wide variety is available as aftermarket parts. Target pistols usually start out as standard models but receive extensive reworking by skilled pistolsmiths resulting in a firearm that is capable of much greater accuracy than the standard versions of the same arm.  A more advanced job a pistolsmith may called on to perform is to construct a completely hand fitted target arm using a serial numbered frame as the base (as required by law) with the rest of the parts supplied with excess metal in certain areas by specialist manufacturers so the pistolsmith can fit these parts together to exacting tolerances. Using these methods, the pistolsmith can build highly accurate firearms that greatly exceed the usual accuracy of standard models of the same model.

Manufacturer
Some gunsmiths used their experience and skills to become small-operation manufacturers, specializing in making only a few types of gun parts, for sale to other gunsmiths and gunmakers. Some of the more important part categories are barrels, trigger assemblies, receivers, and locks.

Training and education

In general, gunsmiths develop and expand their skills through years of experience.

Some common ways to get started in gunsmithing include:
 Community colleges and correspondence courses offer various courses of study (less than two years long) leading to a degree or a certification. Well-known schools offering training in the trade include the Murray State College gunsmithing program, the Pennsylvania Gunsmith School, the Trinidad State Junior College Gunsmithing program, and the Yavapai College Gunsmithing School
 Military training: This is usually at the "Armorer" level, but some, notably the Army Marksmanship Unit (AMU) may have individuals specializing in Sniper or Service Match (Target Competition) arms. These highly gunsmithed ("Accurized") rifles and pistols are derived from standard service models and are used in target shooting and combat marksmanship roles.
 The U.S. Army trains and employs MOS 45B – Small Arms Repairmen. (was redesignated MOS 91F in Spring of 2004)
 The U.S. Air Force trains and employs Combat Arms Instructors (Firearms instructors and small arms repairers)AFSC(MOS) 3P0X1B.
 The U.S. Marine Corps trains and employs MOS 2111 and MOS 2112.
 The U.S. Navy trains and employs gunner's mates (GM).
 Apprenticeships, learning directly from professional gunsmiths:
 The National Rifle Association of America offers short courses in many common tasks and skills of professional gunsmithing. It also sponsors educational programs such as the one at Lassen College in Susanville, CA, and most notable at Trinidad State Junior College in Trinidad CO.

Basic machinist skills, while not limited to gunsmithing, are of great help to aspiring gunsmiths. These may include both machine and hand-tool operations, such as metal turning, drilling, filing, stoning or polishing.

News of the most highly skilled and talented gunsmiths typically spreads by word of mouth, based on the quality of their work. The very best and most talented gunsmiths command premium prices for their services, and may have waiting lists booked for several years in advance.

Legal requirements

In many countries of the world, the possession and ownership of firearms by civilians is highly restricted or outright illegal. The practice of gunsmithing is therefore typically restricted, licensed or regulated. In some circumstances the only legal firearms-related repairs are by individuals trained and employed by the military or police. These individuals are known as armorers. Typically, their skill level is usually far below that of the private or artisan gunsmith. Where the gunsmith frequently has to design, manufacture and fit parts ranging from small internal parts and assemblies, the armorer usually only has to replace standard interchangeable parts belonging to only one type, series, or family of military-related firearms. They typically are furnished a large inventory of standard parts that are known to wear and cause malfunctions in the weapons they will encounter, and they are simply trained to replace these items until satisfactory function is restored.

In the regions where ownership is permitted but limited or restricted to those individuals able to afford the costs of acquiring and owning a firearm, the firearms that are allowed tend to be fewer in number and possess levels of craftsmanship and decoration that approach that of an art object instead of simply a device to expel a projectile. Gunsmithing in these regions (as in Germany and Britain) is concerned with the hand-crafting of completely custom-made firearms tailored to the requirements of the owner.

Federal Republic of Germany

Germany has a tradition of hunting, but this is generally a complicated undertaking that limits its participation. Firearms possession is highly regulated by the police, and most hunters own only one long gun and perhaps a single pistol. One of Germany's more distinctive firearm developments is the drilling, a multi-barrel gun that may incorporate a double-barreled shotgun above with a high-powered single-shot barrel below. These typically have highly sophisticated breech mechanisms, precise fitting, and are hand-engraved by artists specializing in this work. The stocks are usually fitted to the individual and are very expensive wood with highly figured grain. It also is one of the few countries that allow people to consume beer while working on guns.

Italy

Firearms ownership in Italy is regulated by the Italian government but private ownership of various types and numbers of firearms is allowed after proper vetting of the prospective purchaser. Italy has a hunting tradition dating back several centuries. It is the location of some of the finest upland (game bird) hunting in the world. Italy also has a rich history of gunmaking and gunsmithing going back several hundred years with the production of matchlock, flintlock, and caplock rifles and pistols. The city of Brescia, Italy and specifically its suburb of Gardone Val Trompia is historical home to a number of firearm manufacturers and gunsmiths.  Italy is noted as one of the world's leading manufacturing centers of custom-made highly crafted double shotguns. The city of Gardone is the home of several manufacturing firms that sell their products worldwide, with Pietro Beretta (founded in 1526) being the largest and best known. Italian shotguns are noted for their precise fitting, their precision craftsmanship, and the higher grades feature exquisite hand engraving. The Brescia area has several training facilities for the education of apprentices gunsmiths for the crafting of high grade shotguns and rifles. There is also a training academy for engravers and many freelance engravers are located in this area.

Japan
During the Tokugawa period in Japan, starting in the 17th century, the government imposed very restrictive controls on the small number of gunsmiths in the nation, thereby ensuring the almost total prohibition of firearms. Japan, in the postwar period, has had gun regulation which is strict in principle.  Gun licensing is required, and is heavily regulated by the National Police Agency. The weapons law begins by stating "No one shall possess a firearm or firearms or a sword or swords", and very few exceptions are allowed.

United Kingdom
The United Kingdom makes some of the most expensive hand-crafted firearms in the world, despite a highly restrictive ownership environment. Decoration of these arms, typically double-barreled shotguns, is on par with the plates used to mint currency and is priced about the same. Several of the other European countries follow this pattern, as in Italy, where the art of the gunsmith has also reached a high level of sophistication. These craftsmen may specialize as in the case of the gun engraver and stockmaker. Generally, these craftsmen serve long apprenticeships under master gunmakers. They may also be members of Guilds which set up apprentice programmes (often sponsored by the Governments in these countries as highly crafted firearms are important items in the export trade), supervise training, and conduct exams where the journeyman-level gunsmiths submit sample firearms of their own work in order to be admitted the Guild membership. Many of these can only be regarded as "gunmakers" instead of gunsmiths, and do repairs only on the very highest grade firearms. Many are able to make a substantial livelihood.

United States

In the United States, the Bureau of Alcohol, Tobacco, Firearms and Explosives (ATF) is the primary federal agency overseeing all legitimate businesses that deal with firearms, with the exception of firearms made before January 1, 1899 or muzzle loading firearms. The ATF is in charge of the licensing of all legitimate firearms dealers and gunsmiths in the US that engage in business with the public. The issuance of a Federal Firearms License (FFL) involves a thorough background investigation and an inspection of the gunsmith's premises by an Agent of the ATF. The ATF requires all gunsmiths to record all repairs, noting the serial numbers, type of firearm, caliber or gauge, and full particulars of the owner, with an accepted form of Identification ID to be presented and recorded. Gunsmiths are required to maintain these records in a permanent, non-alterable form.

The ATF inspects the premises of all licensed gunsmiths with unannounced visits at periodic intervals. The ATF is granted the power by the U.S. government to initiate the prosecution in U.S. federal court of gunsmiths that wilfully omit or violate these provisions. Punishment can range from losing their FFL (and therefore the privilege to engage in any firearms-related business), to fines and in severe cases, such as conspiring to supply the criminal element with black market weaponry, imprisonment in a federal prison.

Gunsmiths who lack sophisticated machine shop capabilities must understand the law. Enlisting an unlicensed machine shop (one without an FFL) to create gun receivers can be illegal. Other common parts such as grips, barrels, triggers, sights, magazines, recoil springs, and stocks can be manufactured freely, but all receiver development work does require licensing.

Generally, gunsmiths cannot undertake the repair of a firearm they believe is illegally held by a person not permitted to own a firearm (a convicted felon, for instance) or one that otherwise violates the laws where the owner resides. The ownership of firearms in the US is governed by local laws. These laws and regulations vary greatly from state to state, county to county, city to city, and potentially across all jurisdictional lines.

Additionally, modifications to firearms made by gunsmiths are restricted as well. The ATF specifies what modifications are permitted or not permitted and to which firearms that may or may not be applied.

These laws may also vary by:
 firearm type (Handgun, longarm, rifle, shotgun? Cartridge or cap-and-ball? Modern, or antique/antique replica?)
 firearm model (semi-automatic? full automatic? caliber?)
 intended modification (minimum barrel length? magazine size? fully automatic? conversion from cap-and-ball to cartridge?)
 customer or recipient (legal owner? felon? background check?)
 quantity of firearms (how many per week? per month?)

Notable gunsmiths

See also
 Improvised firearm

References

 - LOC 00-109501.
 - LOC 98-61281.
 - LOC 77-90353.
 -  LOC 63-21755.

 - Republished in April 1945 by Thomas G. Samworth, Plantersville, South Carolina.
 -  LOC 2004109586.
 - LOC 97-073035.

Metalworking occupations

fi:Aseseppä